Mott is the sixth studio album by British rock band Mott the Hoople. It peaked at No. 7 in the UK Albums Chart. It is the last album to Feature guitarist Mick Ralphs and first without organist Verden Allen, due to Allen's departure most organ and other keyboard parts are played by Ralphs.

"All the Way from Memphis", an edited version of which was released as a single, received considerable airplay on U.S. radio and captured the band overseas fans, as well as reaching the UK Singles Chart.

Packaging
The album featured different album covers in the U.K. and U.S., as well as remastered tracks on some editions. The U.S. cover featured a photo of the four band members with the word "MOTT" on it, with "Mott The Hoople" written in the O. The U.K. front cover featured an illustration based on a bust of Roman emperor Augustus, the band's name written in a typeface simultaneously evocative of a 1920s Art Deco font and the "Future Shock" font inspired by computer-readable punch cards. Initial copies had a gatefold sleeve with the Augustus image printed on a transparent plastic sheet. The emperor would appear again on the inner sleeve of The Hoople, the band's next and final album in both the United States and the United Kingdom. A remastered and expanded version was released by Sony's Columbia/Legacy imprint in the United States in 2006.

Reception
In 2003, the album was ranked number 366 on Rolling Stone magazine's list of the 500 greatest albums of all time, and 370 in a 2012 revised list.

Track listing
All songs written by Ian Hunter, except where indicated

Side one
 "All the Way from Memphis" – 4:55
 "Whizz Kid" – 3:05
 "Hymn for the Dudes" (Verden Allen, Hunter) – 5:15
 "Honaloochie Boogie" – 2:35
 "Violence" (Hunter, Mick Ralphs) – 4:37

Side two
 "Drivin' Sister" (Hunter, Ralphs) – 4:42
 "Ballad of Mott the Hoople (26th March 1972, Zürich)" (Hunter, Dale "Buffin" Griffin, Peter Watts, Ralphs, Allen) – 5:40
 "I’m a Cadillac / El Camino Dolo Roso" (Ralphs) – 7:40
 "I Wish I Was Your Mother" – 4:41

LP track times from 1973 UK release (CBS 69038).  Published track times for the US release (Columbia 32425) differ slightly.

2006 CD release
 "All the Way from Memphis" – 5:02
 "Whizz Kid" – 3:25
 "Hymn for the Dudes" (Allen, Hunter) – 5:24
 "Honaloochie Boogie" – 2:43
 "Violence" (Hunter, Ralphs) – 4:48
 "Drivin' Sister" (Hunter, Ralphs) – 3:53
 "Ballad of Mott the Hoople (26th March 1972, Zürich)" (Hunter, Griffin, Watts, Ralphs, Allen) – 5:24
 "I’m a Cadillac / El Camino Dolo Roso" (Ralphs) – 7:50
 "I Wish I Was Your Mother" – 4:52

Bonus tracks (2006 reissue)
  "Rose" (Hunter, Ralphs, Watts, Griffin) – 3:56 B-side of "Honaloochie Boogie"; produced by Mott The Hoople
 "Honaloochie Boogie" (Demo version) – 3:07
 "Nightmare" (Demo) (Allen) – 3:36
 "Drivin' Sister" (Hunter, Ralphs) – 4:30 Live 1973 at the Hammersmith Odeon; produced by Dale "Buffin" Griffin

Personnel

Mott the Hoople
 Ian Hunter – lead vocals (All tracks except 8); piano (All tracks except 5); acoustic guitar (Tracks 3, 7, 9); rhythm guitar (Track 6); echo vamper (Tracks 7, 9); arrangements
 Mick Ralphs – lead guitar (All tracks except 9); backing vocals (Tracks 1, 2, 4); organ (Tracks 3, 5, 7, 8); Moogotron (Track 2); mandolins (Track 9); tambourine (track 1); acoustic guitar (Track 8); lead vocals (Track 8)
 Pete "Overend" Watts – bass guitar (All tracks); backing vocals (Track 4); fuzz bass (Track 8)
 Dale "Buffin" Griffin – drums (All tracks); backing vocals (Tracks 1, 3, 4, 6)

Additional personnel
 Paul Buckmaster – electric cello on "Honaloochie Boogie"
 Morgan Fisher – piano, synthesizer, backing vocals on "Drivin' Sister" (live)
 Mick Hince – bells on "I Wish I Was Your Mother"
 Andy Mackay – tenor saxophone on "All The Way from Memphis" and "Honaloochie Boogie"
  – "insane" violin on "Violence"
 Thunderthighs (Karen Friedman, Dari Lalou, Casey Synge) – backing vocals on "Hymn for the Dudes"

Technical
 Dan Loggins – production supervisor
 Alan Harris, Bill Price, John Leckie – engineer
 Roslav Szaybo – art direction, design

Charts
Album

Single

References

Mott the Hoople albums
1973 albums
Columbia Records albums